The Kebun Baru Single Member Constituency is a single member constituency in Ang Mo Kio, Singapore. The current Member of Parliament for the constituency is People's Action Party (PAP) Henry Kwek.

History 
The original Kebun Baru SMC was carved from the now-defunct Ang Mo Kio Single Member Constituency in 1980. It was helmed by Lim Boon Heng throughout its first 11 years of existence. It was absorbed into the new Ang Mo Kio Group Representation Constituency (GRC) prior to the 1991 general election.

Following the release of the Electoral Boundaries Review Committee's report on 13 March 2020, it was announced that, Kebun Baru SMC, would be re-introduced for the 2020 general election. The constituency was carved out of Nee Soon GRC, where the constituency is transferred to in 2015.

In the 2020 general election, People's Action Party's (PAP) Henry Kwek defeated Progress Singapore Party's Kumaran Pillai with a vote count of 62.97% vs 37.03%, which made Kwek the MP for Kebun Baru.

Town Council
Kebun Baru SMC is managed by Ang Mo Kio Town Council which also manages Yio Chu Kang SMC and Ang Mo Kio GRC.

Members of Parliament

Electoral results

Elections in 1980s

Elections in 2020s

References 

1980 establishments in Singapore
1991 disestablishments in Singapore
2020 establishments in Singapore
Ang Mo Kio
Constituencies established in 1980
Constituencies disestablished in 1991
Constituencies established in 2020